Taking an objective approach to an issue means having due regard for the known valid evidence (relevant facts, logical implications and viewpoints and human purposes) pertaining to that issue. If relevant valid evidence is denied, an objective approach is impossible. An objective approach is particularly important in science, and in decision-making processes which affect large numbers of people (e.g. politics).

Science
Scientific progress can be regarded as a three-way contest between rival theories and a stock of evidence held in common. If rival interpretations are denied or if evidence is denied, then this impairs the possibility for rational debate and criticism, and consequently the growth of knowledge. On that ground, many scientists have proclaimed themselves in favour of freedom of thought and expression. If evidence is falsified as for example in conducting a control experiment knowledge is gained leading to the progress of an objective argument as the falsification resembles proof.

Politics
In decisions affecting large numbers of people (such as in politics) ignoring relevant evidence or alternative interpretations could lead to policies which, although perhaps well-intentioned, have the opposite effect of what was really intended.

In this context, it is often argued that although democracy might hamper swift, decisive action, it is nevertheless the best guarantee that all relevant facts and interpretations are included in the decision-making process, resulting in policies with greater long-term benefits.

Criticism
Taking an "objective approach" may not always be relevant, particularly in cases where it is impossible to be objective either because the relevant facts and viewpoints necessary are lacking, or because it is the subjective opinion or response that happens to be important. Thus it is possible to take an "objective approach" inappropriately in situations which call for an expression of subjective thought or feeling.

Sometimes it is argued that an objective approach is impossible because people will naturally take a partisan, self-interested approach.
That is, they will select out those views and facts which agree with their own (cf. confirmation bias). However this view fails to explain why, for example, people will do things which are not in their self-interest, based on what they believe to be an objective approach.

Neutrality
A scientist or politician may never be "neutral" (they may have a vested interest in particular theories or policies) but they might also take an objective approach in the sense of remaining open to alternative viewpoints and new evidence.

In a rational discourse, such an "open-minded" stance is important, especially because it may not be known in advance which facts and arguments are truly relevant to resolving an issue. A "closed" stance would foreclose discussion and debate, usually on the assumption that the relevant facts and arguments are already known and judged.

Authority
Taking an objective approach often contrasts with arguments from authority, where it is argued that X is true because an authority Y says so. The presumption is that Y is an authority capable of taking the most objective approach. But it may be necessary to evaluate the view of Y against other authorities likewise claiming to take an objective approach. This is an important aspect of academic scholarly method in the modern sense. Also, note that Wikipedia is not an uncontroversial (and some would argue not objective) source, and one should consider this when using it for research (which you should not do uncritically or unreservedly).

See also
 Objectivity
 Objectivity (philosophy)
 Subjectivity
 Subjectivism
 Social relations
 Thought

Scientific method